Rev Francis Whitmore Isitt (1843 – 11 November 1916) was a New Zealand Methodist minister, who was general secretary of the New Zealand Alliance (for prohibition) from 1900 to 1909. He was a brother of the Rev Leonard Isitt. 
 
Rev Frank Isitt entered the ministry from the Sydenham Circuit, London and after a term at Richmond College went to New Zealand in 1871. He was a parish minister for a number of years, but after two breakdowns in health concentrated on temperance work. He stood in the 1902 election as a prohibition candidate for ten seats, and came second in eight. He also stood in the 1905 and 1908 elections.

In February 1874 he married 22-year-old Mary Campbell Purdie in Upper Kaikorai, Dunedin. One of their children, Kate Isitt, became a novelist and journalist for the Manchester Guardian newspaper.

References

Photo of Rev Frank Isitt
The History of Methodism in New Zealand by W. Morley (1900) (page 418)

1843 births
1916 deaths
New Zealand Methodist ministers
New Zealand temperance activists
English Methodist ministers
British emigrants to New Zealand
19th-century Methodist ministers
20th-century Methodist ministers
Methodist Church of Great Britain people
Unsuccessful candidates in the 1902 New Zealand general election
Unsuccessful candidates in the 1905 New Zealand general election
Unsuccessful candidates in the 1908 New Zealand general election
Isitt–Caverhill family